Robert Curson (1535) was an English courtier at the court of Henry VIII of England, and also that of emperor Maximilian I.

He was born in Blaxhall, Suffolk.

References

1460 births
1535 deaths
People from Suffolk (before 1974)
English courtiers
Court of Henry VIII